
Nowy Dwór Gdański County is a unit of territorial administration and local government (powiat) in Pomeranian Voivodeship, northern Poland, on the Baltic coast. It came into being on 1 January 1999 as a result of the Polish local government reforms passed in 1998.

As of 2019 its total population is 35,656, out of which the population of Nowy Dwór Gdański is 9,905, that of Krynica Morska is 1,303, and the rural population is 24,448.

Nowy Dwór Gdański County on a map of the counties of Pomeranian Voivodeship

Nowy Dwór Gdański County is bordered by the Vistula Lagoon to the east, Elbląg County to the south-east, Malbork County to the south, Gdańsk County and the city of Gdańsk to the west, and the Baltic Sea to the north. It also has a short land border with Russia (Kaliningrad Oblast) to the north-east, on the Vistula Spit.

Administrative division
The county is subdivided into five gminas (one urban, one urban-rural and three rural). These are listed in the following table, in descending order of population.

References

 
Land counties of Pomeranian Voivodeship
Polders